Evert Skoglund (born May 10, 1953 in Milan) is an Italian former professional footballer. He played in many years in the Italian leagues.

His father Lennart Skoglund was a famous player for F.C. Internazionale Milano and Sweden national football team. His younger brother Giorgio Skoglund also played football professionally. To distinguish them, Evert was known as Skoglund I and Giorgio as Skoglund II.

References

1953 births
Living people
Footballers from Milan
Italian footballers
Association football midfielders
Inter Milan players
Calcio Lecco 1912 players
U.S. Lecce players
Piacenza Calcio 1919 players
Aurora Pro Patria 1919 players
Serie A players
Italian people of Swedish descent
A.C.D. Sant'Angelo 1907 players